Joe Walker is a British film editor working in Los Angeles. In 2022, he won the Academy Award for Best Film Editing for his work on Dune, having been nominated twice before for 12 Years a Slave and Arrival.  For the American Cinema Editors Award for Best Edited Feature Film – Dramatic he has received a string of five nominations over eight years and in 2016 he won, for Arrival.  He took the European Film Award for Best Editor for Shame in 2012 and Satellite Award for Best Editing for Sicario in 2016.

Life and career 
Walker learned his craft in the BBC's Film Department at Ealing Studios. As a Sound Editor, he coaxed animal impersonator Percy Edwards out of retirement to provide gorilla noises for Philip Saville's series First Born. After cutting classical music documentaries for the BBC, Walker broke into editing drama with Julian Farino's Out of the Blue and comedy with two series of David Renwick's Jonathan Creek.

Walker has had notable partnerships with two major directors: Steve McQueen and Denis Villeneuve .

His first collaboration with McQueen, Hunger (2008), was a portrayal of the IRA hunger strikes at Long Kesh starring Michael Fassbender as Bobby Sands. It won the Caméra d'Or at the Cannes Film Festival. Joining again the team of McQueen, Fassbender and cinematographer Sean Bobbitt, Walker cut Shame (2011). This told the story of a successful Manhattanite navigating the terrain of sexual obsession on a path towards self-destruction. Their third collaboration was 12 Years a Slave (2013), the true story of Solomon Northup, a free man kidnapped and sold into slavery, set in 1840s Louisiana. It stars Chiwetel Ejiofor, Brad Pitt, Michael Fassbender, Lupita Nyong'o, Sarah Paulson, Paul Dano, and Paul Giamatti. 12 Years a Slave (2013) won three Academy Awards: Best Picture, Best Supporting Actress for Nyong'o, and Best Adapted Screenplay for John Ridley. In her acceptance speech, Nyong'o paid tribute to Walker, describing him as "the invisible performer in the editing room". The film was awarded the Golden Globe Award for Best Motion Picture – Drama, and the British Academy of Film and Television Arts recognized it with the Best Film and Best Actor for Ejiofor.

Walker's partnership with Denis Villeneuve has comprised five feature films. Their first, Sicario, is a 2015 American crime-thriller drama film starring Benicio del Toro and Josh Brolin in which an idealistic FBI agent Emily Blunt is enlisted in a secret CIA op to bring down the head of a brutal Mexican drug cartel. Arrival is a 2016 American psychological science fiction film based on the 1998 short story "Story of Your Life" by Ted Chiang starring Amy Adams, Jeremy Renner, and Forest Whitaker. Villeneuve said of the movie's creation, "Each film has its hero. For this one, the editor Joe Walker is mine. Arrival was by far the hardest film to edit. Christ, we worked hard!". Their third collaboration is Blade Runner 2049, the sequel to Blade Runner (1982). They next partnered on Dune (2021), based on Frank Herbert novel of the same name. A fifth collaboration Dune: Part Two, is set to be released on November 3, 2023.

Walker has talked about time being the editor's "greatest superpower". His films with McQueen and Villeneuve showcase experiments with cross-cutting and flashback structures. McQueen has paid tribute to Walker's ability to find the rhythm of a film.  "A great film editor is attuned to the silences.  They can be just as valuable as the words.  It's all about timing.  And that's what he has – Joe has time."

In 2010, Walker cut the documentary-feature Life in a Day for Academy Award-winning director Kevin Macdonald and producer Ridley Scott. It was filmed by YouTube users around the world on a single day in July 2010 and is distilled from the 4,500 hours of footage submitted. The movie premiered at the Sundance Film Festival in January 2011.

Walker has edited many British Indie features such as The Escapist (2008) written and directed by Rupert Wyatt; Harry Brown (2009), starring Michael Caine as a modern-day vigilante; and Brighton Rock (2010), a reworking of the Graham Greene classic that set the action against a backdrop of the Mod and Rocker riots of 1964.

Walker has cut many British TV programs: Jimmy McGovern's The Lakes; Eroica for the BBC; ITV blockbuster Doctor Zhivago starring Sam Neill and Keira Knightley; Sword of Honour for Channel 4, starring Daniel Craig; The Devil's Whore, for director Marc Munden and Tommy Tiernan for director Richard Ayoade.

Walker was initially trained as a classical composer. In 1984, he received his B.A. degree in music at the University of York. His music has been played by the Royal Philharmonic Orchestra, live in Trafalgar Square. He wrote the score for the BBC/HBO drama Dirty War. In January 2019, Joe was awarded an honorary doctorate by the University of York.

Filmography

Film

Television 
 The Devil's Whore (2 episodes) (2008)
 Coup! (2006)
 The Virgin Queen (2005)
 Eroica (2003)
 Doctor Zhivago (2002)
 Sword of Honour (2001)
 The Secret World of Michael Fry (2000)
 Jonathan Creek (6 episodes) (1998–1999)
 The Lakes (6 episodes) (1999)
 In the Red (1998)
 Solti: The Making of a Maestro (1998)
 Out of the Blue (1995)

Accolades 
Academy Award for Best Film Editing
 2013: 12 Years a Slave (nominated)
 2016: Arrival (nominated)
 2021: Dune (won)

Alliance of Women Film Journalists Award for Best Editing
 2013: 12 Years a Slave (nominated)
 2016: Arrival (nominated)

American Cinema Editors Award for Best Edited Feature Film – Dramatic
 2013: 12 Years a Slave (nominated)
 2015: Sicario (nominated)
 2016: Arrival (won)
 2017: Blade Runner 2049 (nominated)
 2021: Dune (nominated)

BAFTA Award for Best Editing
 2013: 12 Years a Slave (nominated)
 2016: Arrival (nominated)
 2017: Blade Runner 2049 (nominated)
 2021: Dune (nominated)

British Independent Film Award for Best Technical Achievement
 2011: Shame (nominated)

Chicago Film Critics Association Award for Best Editing
 2013: 12 Years a Slave (nominated)

Critics' Choice Movie Award for Best Editing
 2013: 12 Years a Slave (nominated)
 2016: Arrival (nominated)
 2017: Blade Runner 2049 (nominated)
 2018: Widows (nominated)

European Film Award for Best Editor
 2011: Shame (won)

Evening Standard British Film Award for Best Technical Achievement
 2008: The Escapist and Hunger (nominated)

Online Film Critics Society Award for Best Editing
 2013: 12 Years a Slave (nominated)
 2015: Sicario (nominated)
 2016: Arrival (nominated)

Phoenix Film Critics Society Award for Best Film Editing
 2013: 12 Years a Slave (nominated)

San Diego Film Critics Society Award for Best Editing
 2013: 12 Years a Slave (nominated)
 2015: Sicario (nominated)
 2016: Arrival (nominated)

San Francisco Film Critics Circle Award for Best Editing
 2013: 12 Years a Slave (nominated)
 2015: Sicario (nominated)
 2016: Arrival (won)
 2017: Blade Runner 2049 (nominated)

Satellite Award for Best Editing
 2011: Shame (nominated)
 2013: 12 Years a Slave (nominated)
 2015: Sicario (won)
 2018: Widows (nominated)
 2021: Dune (won)

Washington D.C. Area Film Critics Association Award for Best Editing
 2013: 12 Years a Slave (nominated)
 2015: Sicario (nominated)
 2016: Arrival (nominated)
 2017: Blade Runner 2049 (nominated)

References

External links 
 Interview with Bright Lights Film Journal
 

1963 births
Living people
British film editors
Best Film Editing Academy Award winners
Alumni of the University of York